The 1983 Woodpecker Welsh Professional Championship was a professional non-ranking snooker tournament, which took place between 16 and 20 February 1983 at the Ebbw Vale Leisure Centre in Ebbw Vale, Wales.

Ray Reardon won the tournament defeating Doug Mountjoy 9–1 in the final.

Main draw

References

Welsh Professional Championship
Welsh Professional Championship
Welsh Professional Championship
Welsh Professional Championship